Dorjkhandyn Khüderbulga is a Mongolian freestyle wrestler.

2012 season
Khüderbulga took bronze at the 2012 Asian Wrestling Championships.

2013 season
He took bronze at the 2013 Asian Wrestling Championships and the 2013 Summer Universiade.  He also competed at the 2013 World Wrestling Championships, losing in the first round.

2014 season
Khüderbulga won the 2014 Asian Wrestling Championships and took bronze at the 2014 Asian Games.  He was also made it to the quarterfinals at the 2014 World Wrestling Championships.

2015 season
He lost in the first round at the 2015 World Wrestling Championships.

2016 season
Khüderbulga qualified for the 2016 Olympics by making the finals at the 2016 World Wrestling Olympic Qualification Tournament 2 after losing the Olympic wrestle-off at the 2016 World Wrestling Olympic Qualification Tournament 1.

References

External links
 

1989 births
Living people
Mongolian male sport wrestlers
Wrestlers at the 2014 Asian Games
Asian Games medalists in wrestling
Universiade medalists in wrestling
Medalists at the 2014 Asian Games
Wrestlers at the 2016 Summer Olympics
Asian Games bronze medalists for Mongolia
Universiade bronze medalists for Mongolia
Medalists at the 2013 Summer Universiade
Asian Wrestling Championships medalists
People from Töv Province
20th-century Mongolian people
21st-century Mongolian people